Karan Sharma may refer to:

Karan Sharma (actor), Indian film actor
Karan Sharma (TV actor), Indian television actor
Karn Sharma (born 1987), Indian cricketer
Karan Sharma (cricketer, born 1996), Indian cricketer
Karan Sharma (cricketer, born 1998), Indian cricketer
Karan Sharma, director of web series Maharani